On September 2, 2018, a suicide car bombing took place in Mogadishu, Somalia. The attack left at least 6 people dead and another 14 were injured.

Incident
On September 2, 2018, a car bomb was set off near a government office after being stopped at a checkpoint by military personnel, killing at least 6 people including the 3 soldiers present and injuring 14 other people. It also caused a nearby school to collapse, damaged nearby houses, and blew the roof off a mosque, as well as destroying the targeted building.

Reaction
Shortly after the attack, the Islamist militant group al-Shabaab claimed responsibility for the attack. The group has often targeted the capital with bombings, including a truck bomb in October 2017 that killed 587 people.

References

2010s in Mogadishu
2018 in Somalia
2018 murders in Somalia
2018 road incidents
2 September 2018 bombing
2010s road incidents in Africa
21st-century mass murder in Somalia
2 September 2018 bombing
Attacks on buildings and structures in 2018
2 September 2018 bombing
2 September 2018 bombing
Attacks on government buildings and structures
Islamic terrorist incidents in 2018
Mass murder in 2018
2 September 2018 bombing
Road incidents in Somalia
September 2018 crimes in Africa
September 2018 events in Africa
Suicide bombings in 2018
2 September 2018
Suicide car and truck bombings in Somalia
Terrorist incidents in Somalia in 2018
Somali Civil War (2009–present)